Begonia goegoensis, the fire-king begonia, is a species of flowering plant in the family Begoniaceae, native to Sumatra. In 1882 it was exhibited by Veitch and Sons and received a first class certificate from the Royal Horticultural Society. Valued for its striking red-backed leaves, it can be propagated from cuttings, although seeds may do better.

References

goegoensis
Endemic flora of Indonesia
Endemic flora of Sumatra
Plants described in 1882
Taxa named by N. E. Brown